Brian Gottfried was the defending champion but lost in the quarterfinals to Johan Kriek.

Stan Smith won in the final 4–6, 7–6, 7–6, 6–3 against Balázs Taróczy.

Seeds

  Brian Gottfried (quarterfinals)
  Corrado Barazzutti (semifinals)
  Balázs Taróczy (final)
  Stan Smith (champion)
  Johan Kriek (semifinals)
  Tomáš Šmíd (quarterfinals)
  Jaime Fillol (first round)
  Karl Meiler (second round)

Draw

Final

Section 1

Section 2

External links
 1978 Fischer-Grand Prix Draw

Singles